Margaret A. Rykowski is a rear admiral in the United States Navy Reserve and serves as Deputy Fleet Surgeon, United States Fleet Forces Command and Deputy Director, United States Navy Nurse Corps, Reserve Component.

Early life
A native of Milwaukee, Wisconsin, Rykowski is a graduate of the University of Wisconsin–Milwaukee. As a civilian, she works as a nursing director at San Francisco General Hospital.

Military career
Rykowski joined the United States Navy Reserve in 1987. She was called to active duty for the Gulf War and was assigned to Naval Hospital Oakland. Later, she transferred to Naval Hospital Oakland following her release from active duty.

In 2003, Rykowski was recalled to active duty for the War in Afghanistan and was stationed in Bremerton, Washington. She was later mobilized to the Landstuhl Regional Medical Center in Germany. After her return, she was assigned to the United States Third Fleet.

Awards Rykowski has received include the Meritorious Service Medal, the Navy and Marine Corps Commendation Medal with three award stars and the Army Commendation Medal.

References

Military personnel from Milwaukee
United States Navy rear admirals
Female admirals of the United States Navy
United States Navy personnel of the Gulf War
United States Navy personnel of the War in Afghanistan (2001–2021)
American women nurses
University of Wisconsin–Milwaukee alumni
Living people
Women in 21st-century warfare
United States Navy reservists
1965 births
20th-century American women
21st-century American women